This Side Up may refer to:
 This Side Up (Scream album), 1985
 This Side Up (David Benoit album), 1986
 This Side Up (Jon album), 2002
 "This Side Up" (song), a 2003 single by Danish singer Jon Nørgaard

See also
 This Way Up (disambiguation)